Hareton Earnshaw is a character in Emily Brontë's 1847 novel Wuthering Heights. He is the son of Hindley Earnshaw and Hindley's wife, Frances.  At the end of the novel, he makes plans to wed Catherine Linton, with whom he falls in love.

Story 

Frances dies shortly after giving birth in June 1778 to Hareton, which results in Hindley's descent into a life of anguish and inebriety, so Hareton is cared for and nursed by Nelly Dean, the primary narrator of the story.  When Nelly leaves to reside at Thrushcross Grange with Catherine Earnshaw and Edgar Linton, Heathcliff seeks revenge on Hindley and gains control of Wuthering Heights.  Hindley dies shortly after the decease of Catherine Earnshaw, and Heathcliff sets out to treat Hareton as cruelly and unjustly as Hindley treated him: he reduces Hareton to servant-boy status at the Heights. 

Because of the dark, savage environment in which he grows up, the boy becomes an ignorant, dirty and uneducated man, unable to read or write.  When Cathy Linton comes to Wuthering Heights sixteen years later, Hareton has not changed, but it is apparent that he sees Heathcliff as his own father and loves him dearly.  Heathcliff has a secret regard for Hareton as well, but he wishes him to feel the same pain that he himself experienced in childhood.  Hareton forms an attraction to Cathy, but she dismisses it with disgust, insisting that he is a mindless, rude beast of a man.  This only continues after Cathy's husband, Linton Heathcliff, dies, and Cathy becomes accustomed to the terror of Wuthering Heights.  She grows just as rude and cold as its inhabitants, and, whenever Hareton expresses any amount of regard or tenderness towards her, she spurns it.

Cathy and Hareton's relationship changes when, eventually, Cathy decides to help him with his secret self-education by teaching him how to read and talk properly.  At first Hareton is uneasy about this, suspecting some patronising trickery, but it soon comes to be that the two fall in love.  Heathcliff thus allows his emotions to take him over, and, because of his secret regard for Hareton (who in many ways resembles him), his sudden indifference about his enemies' destruction and his increasingly overwhelming desire to be with his soul mate Catherine Earnshaw, he lets the two continue their romance.  Hareton is deeply hurt by his subsequent death, because he views Heathcliff as his true father.  He kisses his corpse relentlessly, digging the grave with tears spilling down his cheeks.  As Nelly points out, "poor Hareton, the most wronged, was the only one who really suffered much" for Heathcliff's demise:

He sat by the corpse all night, weeping in bitter earnest.  He pressed its hand, and kissed the sarcastic, savage face that every one else shrank from contemplating; and bemoaned him with that strong grief which springs naturally from a generous heart, though it be tough as tempered steel.

At the close of Wuthering Heights, Cathy and Hareton plan to live in Thrushcross Grange and marry on New Year's Day, adding a sense of the happy ending to an otherwise dark story.

Description 
Hareton is a broad-shouldered, strong man, with dark hair.  Isabella Linton says that he has "a look of Catherine [Earnshaw] in his eyes", and indeed he and Catherine (Earnshaw) Linton both have the dark brown "Earnshaw eyes".  He seems to carry Heathcliff's spirit, and the two have a strange regard for one another, in spite of the fact that Heathcliff has completely ruined his life.  Heathcliff also sees Catherine Earnshaw in him, which would appear to make Hareton a source of pain.  He sometimes tries to get along with Linton (Heathcliff's son), but didn't get well.  His romance with Cathy Linton may partly explain why Heathcliff finally ends his life, potentially at peace, without taking any further revenge on anyone.

References

Characters in Wuthering Heights